Jasień is a non-operational PKP railway station in Jasień (Pomeranian Voivodeship), Poland.

Lines crossing the station

References 
Jasień article at Polish Stations Database, URL accessed at 27 March 2006

Railway stations in Pomeranian Voivodeship
Disused railway stations in Pomeranian Voivodeship
Bytów County